Porphyromonas pogonae  is a Gram-negative bacterium from the genus of Porphyromonas which has been isolated from human clinical specimen.

References 

Bacteroidia
Bacteria described in 2015